Linda McNabb (born 16 August 1963) is a British-born New Zealand children's author who has written several fantasy novels for children and young adults.

Biography
McNabb was born in Rutland, England in 1963. She moved to New Zealand five years later and lives in Auckland. Her 2002 book The Dragon’s Apprentice was a finalist in the 2003 New Zealand Post Children's Book Awards...

Bibliography
 And the winner is... (2001)
 Dragon's Apprentice (2002)
 The Puppet Master (2003)
 The Stonekeeper's Daughter (2004)
 The Seventh Son (2005)
 Circle of Dreams: Runeweaver (2005)
 Mountains of Fire (2006)
 The Crystal Runners (2006)
 Valley of Silver (2007)
 The Shadow Hunters (2007)
 Circle of Dreams: Timeweaver (2007)
 Dragons' Bane (2008)
 Circle of Dreams: Starweaver (2008)

References

External links
 Official site

1963 births
New Zealand people of English descent
Living people
New Zealand children's writers
New Zealand women novelists
People from Auckland
People from Rutland
21st-century New Zealand novelists
New Zealand women children's writers
21st-century New Zealand women writers